Laura Borden, Lady Borden (née Bond; November 26, 1861 – September 7, 1940) was the wife of Sir Robert Laird Borden who was the eighth Prime Minister of Canada.

She was born in Halifax, Nova Scotia, and married Borden in September 1889. She served as president of the Local Council of Women of Halifax until her resignation in 1901.

In recognition of her affability and graciousness, the Conservative Party presented her with an automobile to recognize her contributions to the Canadian identity.

She died in Ottawa in 1940 and is buried next to her husband at Beechwood Cemetery.

See also
Spouse of the prime minister of Canada

References 

1862 births
1940 deaths
Spouses of prime ministers of Canada